William Corson (December 23, 1909 – January 28, 1981) was an American film actor.

Partial filmography

Sea Devils (1937) - Coast Guard Seaman (uncredited)
China Passage (1937) - Ship's Officer (uncredited)
The Woman I Love (1937) - (uncredited)
You Can't Buy Luck (1937) - Reporter (uncredited)
Behind The Headlines (1937) - Gang Member (uncredited)
There Goes My Girl (1937) - Dan Curtis
You Can't Beat Love (1937) - Frame-Up Photographer (uncredited)
New Faces of 1937 (1937) - Assistant Stage Manager
On Again-Off Again (1937) - Smith (uncredited)
Super-Sleuth (1937) - Beckett
Forty Naughty Girls (1937) - Man Watching Piper Enter Theater (uncredited)
Hideaway (1937) - Bill Parker
Music for Madame (1937) - Bus Driver (uncredited)
Stage Door (1937) - Bill
Double Danger (1938) - First Chauffeur (uncredited)
Bringing Up Baby (1938) - Minor Role (uncredited)
Go Chase Yourself (1938) - Reporter (uncredited)
Having Wonderful Time (1938) - Camp Waiter (uncredited)
Sky Giant (1938) - Cadet Trainee Claridge (uncredited)
Carefree (1938) - Minor Role (uncredited)
Mr. Doodle Kicks Off (1938) - Henchman (uncredited)
The Mad Miss Manton (1938) - Ronnie Belden (uncredited)
Annabel Takes a Tour (1938) - Reporter (uncredited)
Zorro's Fighting Legion (1939, Serial) - Ramon (final film role)

External links

1909 births
1981 deaths
Male actors from Seattle
20th-century American male actors
American male film actors
People from Camano, Washington